Eero is an Estonian and Finnish masculine given name (pronounced: /e:ro/). Notable people with the name include:

 Eero Aarnio (born 1932), Finnish interior designer
 Eero Aho (born 1968), Finnish actor
 Eero Akaan-Penttilä (born 1943), Finnish politician
 Eero Antikainen (1906–1960), Finnish trade union leader and politician
 Eero Berg (1898–1969), Finnish athlete 
 Eero Böök (1910–1990), Finnish chess player and engineer
 Eero Elo (born 1990), Finnish ice hockey player
 Eero Endjärv (born 1973), Estonian architect
 Eero Epner (born 1978), Estonian art historian and playwright
 Eero Erkko (1860–1927), Finnish journalist and politician 
 Eero Haapala (born 1989), Finnish long jumper
 Eero Haapalainen (c. 1880 – 1937), Finnish Communist leader
 Eero Hämeenniemi (born 1951), Finnish composer, musician and writer
 Eero Heinonen (born 1979), Finnish musician and bass player in The Rasmus
 Eero Heinäluoma (born 1955), Finnish politician and former Speaker of the Parliament
 Eero Hirvonen (born 1996), Finnish Nordic combined skier
 Eero Huovinen (born 1944), former Bishop of Helsinki 
 Eero Hynninen (born 1953), Finnish sprint canoer and Olympic competitor 
 Eero Hyvärinen (1890–1973), Finnish gymnast and Olympic competitor
 Eero Järnefelt (1863–1937), Finnish realist painter
 Eero Kilpeläinen (born 1985), Finnish ice hockey goaltender
 Eero Kilpi (1882–1954), Finnish actor  
 Eero Koivistoinen (born 1946), Finnish jazz musician and saxophone player
 Eero Kolehmainen (1918–2013), Finnish cross country skier
 Eero Korte (born 1987), Finnish football midfielder
 Eero Lehmann (born 1974), German fencer and Olympic competitor 
 Eero Lehti (born 1944), Finnish politician and businessman
 Eero Lehtonen (1898–1959), Finnish pentathlete
 Eero Liives (1892–1978), Estonian composer and violinist
 Eero Lohi (born 1927), Finnish modern pentathlete and Olympic competitor 
 Eero Loone (born 1935), Estonian philosopher
 Eero Mäkelä (1942–2008), Finnish chef
 Eero Mäntyranta (1937–2013), Finnish skier and Olympic medalist
 Eero Markkanen (born  1991), Finnish football player
 Eero Milonoff (born 1980), Finnish actor
 Eero Naapuri (1918–1987), Finnish colonel and skier and Olympic competitor 
 Eero Neemre (1905–1994), Estonian actor and theatre director
 Eero Nelimarkka (1891–1977), Finnish painter
 Eero Palm (born 1974), Estonian architect
 Eero Paloheimo (born 1936), Finnish designer, politician and university professor
 Eero Peltonen (born 1986), Finnish football striker
 Eero Rebo (born 1974), Estonian military colonel
 Eero Ritala (born 1983), Finnish actor
 Eero Roine (1904–1966), Finnish actor 
 Eero Saari (born 1928), Finnish professional ice hockey player
 Eero Saarinen (1910–1961), Finnish-American architect
 Eero Salisma (1916–1998), Finnish professional ice hockey player
 Eero Salo (1921-1975), Finnish politician
 Eero Savilahti (born 1992), Finnish ice hockey player
 Eero Simoncelli, American computational neuroscientist
 Eero Somervuori (born 1979), Finnish ice hockey forward
 Eero Spriit (born 1949), Estonian actor and producer 
 Eero Tapio (born 1941), Finnish wrestler and Olympic competitor
 Eero Tarasti (born 1948), Finnish musicologist and semiotician 
 Eero Tuomaala (1926–1988), Finnish long-distance runner and Olympic competitor
 Eero Väre (born 1984), Finnish ice hockey goaltender

As a surname
Endel Eero (1930–2006), Estonian politician

Other uses
 Eero is also a brand of wireless routers owned by Amazon.

Estonian masculine given names
Finnish masculine given names